Self Title (styled as self=title) is Treble Charger's EP originally released in February 1995. It was re-released by RCA on November 26, 1996, and BMG in 1997. The album was nominated for "Best Alternative Album" at the 1997 Juno Awards.

This disk featured CD-ROM contents, called "screen zine" in the track listing, profiling some of the band's friends and colleagues in the Canadian indie rock scene of the era (including Change of Heart, Hayden, The Inbreds, Thrush Hermit, By Divine Right and Shortfall.)

Track listing
All songs written by Treble Charger.

"Morale" – 4:37
"Even Grable" – 4:10
"Case In Fact" – 4:13
"Cleric's Hip" – 1:56
"Sick Friend Called" – 3:27
"Motor Control" – 3:18
"Slight" – 4:56
"Disclaimer" – 3:12 *
"Half Down" – 2:48 *
There were 3 different releases of this cd, one was self-released, one released by Sonic Unyon and one released by RCA for the American market.  The self-released copy had a data track at the start (which is the screen zine part of it), the Sonic Unyon one had the zines, but it wasn't visible to cd players.  The RCA release included the tracks Disclaimer and Half Down (tracks 8 and 9) and the bands on the zines were changed to American bands.

Credits
Treble Charger - Mixing
Greig Nori    - Guitar, Vocals
Bill Priddle  - Guitar, Vocals
Rosie Martin  - Bass guitar, Vocals (background)
Morris Palter     - drums
Jon Auer       - Mixing
Joao Carvalho  - Mastering
Chris Jackson      - Artwork
Ted Jensen         - Mastering
Brian Malouf       - Mixing
Brad Nelson        - Mixing Assistant
Rob Sanzo          - Engineer

References

Treble Charger albums
1995 EPs
Sonic Unyon Records EPs